Sailing Yacht A is a sailing yacht launched in 2015. The vessel is a sail-assisted motor yacht designed by Philippe Starck (exteriors and interiors) and built by Nobiskrug in Kiel, Germany for the Russian billionaire Andrey Melnichenko.

Its propulsion consists of a variable-speed hybrid powerplant with two lineshaft controllable-pitch propellers that is sail-assisted by a three-mast fore-and-aft sailing rig. The freestanding carbonfiber rotating masts were manufactured by Magma Structures at Trafalgar Wharf, Portsmouth. Doyle Sailmakers USA manufactured the three fully automated carbonfiber/taffeta full roach sails. The furling booms were built in Valencia by Future Fibres. The rigging of the yacht was developed partially to be implemented on cargo ships and for commercial use. The vessel features an underwater observation pod in the keel with -thick glass. It is the largest private sail-assisted motor yacht in the world.

Sailing Yacht A was delivered by Nobiskrug on 3 February 2017, and left Kiel on 5 February 2017. It exited the Baltic Sea in light mode on near-empty fuel tanks in order to clear the Drogden Strait with minimum draught. It underwent final sea trials and the final fit-out at the Navantia shipyard in Cartagena, Spain. Boat International called it "the boundary pushing superyacht".

The yacht was seized by the Italian authorities on 12 March 2022 in the port of Trieste, due to the EU's sanctions imposed on a number of Russian businessmen as a consequence of Russia's invasion of Ukraine. A spokesperson for Melnichenko vowed to contest the seizure.

Specifications 
Building site: Kiel, Germany
Builder: Nobiskrug
Naval architecture: Nobiskrug & Dykstra Naval Architects
Exterior design: Philippe Starck
Interior decoration: Philippe Starck
Diesel powerplant: two MTU 20V 4000 M73L 2,050 rpm 3,600 kW lineshaft engines
Electric powerplant: four 14,050–24,050rpm 2,800 kW hotel generators driving two Vacon 4,300 kW lineshaft motors
Transmission: superimposable/clutched diesel-electric transmission controlled by DEIF systems
Propulsion: Andritz Hydro / Escher Wyss & Cie. 5-bladed controllable-pitch lineshaft  twin screw
Emission treatment: Emigreen, 4 × diesel particulate filter (soot filtration) on diesel generators.

See also
 List of large sailing yachts

References

Individual sailing yachts
Three-masted ships
Ships built in Kiel
Sailing yachts built in Germany
2015 ships